Alejandro David Fiorina (born 11 March 1988) is an Argentine former professional footballer who played as a forward.

References
 
 
 Alejandro Fiorina at playmakerstats.com (English version of ceroacero.es)

1988 births
Living people
Footballers from Rosario, Santa Fe
Argentine people of Italian descent
Argentine footballers
Argentine expatriate footballers
Association football forwards
Estudiantes de La Plata footballers
Grupo Universitario de Tandil players
Central Córdoba de Rosario footballers
Comercial Futebol Clube (Ribeirão Preto) players
San Luis de Quillota footballers
Coquimbo Unido footballers
Ñublense footballers
Torneo Argentino B players
Primera C Metropolitana players
Primera B Metropolitana players
Primera B de Chile players
Chilean Primera División players
Argentine expatriate sportspeople in Brazil
Expatriate footballers in Brazil
Argentine expatriate sportspeople in Chile
Expatriate footballers in Chile